Lars Bryggman (born January 9, 1993) is a Swedish ice hockey player. He is currently playing with the Lahti Pelicans of the Liiga (Finland).

Bryggman made his Swedish Hockey League debut playing with Luleå HF during the 2013–14 SHL season.

References

External links

1993 births
Living people
Asplöven HC players
Leksands IF players
Luleå HF players
Malmö Redhawks players
Piteå HC players
Swedish ice hockey forwards
Sportspeople from Umeå